My Side of Your Window is the third album released in the UK by British folk musician Ralph McTell, and the first produced by the artist himself. He had left college and had moved into his first house in Putney. "Girl on a Bicycle" was covered by Herman van Veen and was a hit in the Netherlands and West Germany.

Track listing
All titles by Ralph McTell except where stated.

Side One
"Michael in the Garden" - 4:24
"Clown" - 3:34
"Girl on a Bicycle" (lyrics: Ralph McTell; music: Gary Petersen) - 3:19
"Father Forgive Them" - 2:21
"All Things Change" - 2:47

Side Two
"I've Thought About It" - 4:13
"Factory Girl" - 4:54
"Blues in More Than 12 Bars" - 4:35
"Kew Gardens" - 2:15
"Wait Until the Snow" - 3:05
"Silver Birch and Weeping Willow" - 2:00

Personnel
Ralph McTell - acoustic guitar, harmonica, piano, vocals
Bruce Barthol - bass
"Neil" - flute on "Michael in the Garden" and "Factory Girl"
Brian "Brock" Brocklehurst - bass
Gary Petersen - acoustic guitar, piano, organ
Phil Greenberg - lead guitar on "I've Thought About It" and "Wait Until the Snow"
John Marshall - drums on "I've Thought About It" and "Wait Until the Snow"
Clive Palmer - banjo, fiddle on "Blues in More Than 12 Bars"
Mick Bennett - percussion on "Blues in More Than 12 Bars"
Folk Weavers - vocal accompaniment on "Kew Gardens"
Tony Visconti - string arrangements
Brian Brittain - vocal arrangement on "Kew Gardens"

Production credits
Producer: Ralph McTell (except track 3, Gus Dudgeon)
Engineers: Tom Allom and "Adrian" at Regent Sound
Model used on sleeve design: Peter Thaine
Liner notes: Robin Denselow

Awards and accolades
Upon its release, My Side of Your Window was Melody Maker's Folk LP of the Month.
During his 60th birthday concert at the Royal Festival Hall in November 2004, McTell was presented with a Gold Disc of My Side of Your Window.

Release history

Many of the tracks on this album also feature in the Spiral Staircase - Classic Songs compilation.

Track variations

The UK 2007 CD release includes four bonus tracks:
12. "Summer Come Along" (1)
13. "Michael in the Garden" (2)
14. "Clown" (2)
15. "Factory Girl" (2)

(1) A single released in the UK in 1969
(2) Re-mixed or re-recorded in 1970 for "Revisited"

References

Ralph McTell albums
1969 albums
Albums arranged by Tony Visconti
Transatlantic Records albums